Henrik Ekman, (born 22 June 1951) is a Swedish author, television presenter and producer.

Ekman is also a freelance journalist and has also been working for SVT with finding and buying rights for nature and science programmes for the channel. He was the presenter of Vetenskapens värld, which was broadcast on SVT between 2002 and 2007.

In January 2014, Ekman was awarded the environmental prize by the Engineers of Sweden.

Bibliography
Ekman, Henrik; Pettersson Börje, Ekman Henrik (1987). Ekarnas hagar. Stockholm: LT. Libris 7253284.  (inb.)
Ekman Henrik, Beckman Mona, red (1989). Växter, svampar, djur: elementa : miljögrunder (1. uppl.). Stockholm: Utbildningsradion. Libris 7227684.  (inb.)
Ekman, Henrik; Landin Bo (1991). Ishav. Stockholm: Natur & Kultur. Libris 7229404.  (inb.)
Marken. Miljökunskap (Natur & Kultur), 99-1448912-5. Stockholm: Natur & Kultur. 1992. Libris 7231811. 
Ekman Henrik, red (1993). Luften. Miljökunskap (Natur & Kultur), 99-1448912-5. Stockholm: Natur & Kultur. Libris 7231812. 
Ekman Henrik, red (1993). Vatten. Miljökunskap (Natur & Kultur), 99-1448912-5. Stockholm: Natur & Kultur. Libris 7231813. 
Brusewitz, Gunnar; Ekman Henrik (1995). Ekoparken: Djurgården - Haga - Ulriksdal. Stockholm: Wahlström & Widstrand. Libris 7282221.  (inb.) 
Runeman, Rune (2000). Runes lilla röda stuga. Stockholm: Bark design. Libris 7454963. 
Runeman, Rune (2001). Runes blå dunster. Stockholm: Bark design. Libris 8384320. 
Ekman, Henrik (2004). De sista ängarna: röster från ett landskap i förändring. Stockholm: Wahlström & Widstrand. Libris 9411309.  (inb.)
Ekman, Henrik (2007). Ekmans älgar. Malmö: Damm. Libris 10428567.  (inb.)
Ekman, Henrik (2010). Vargen: den jagade jägaren. Stockholm: Norstedt. Libris 11814520.  (inb.) 
Ekman, Henrik (2011). Vår sanna natur: naturfotograferna ser på Sverige. Stockholm: Ica Bokförlag. Libris 12134961.  (inb.)
Ekman, Henrik; Lena Haglund; Bertil Lintner; Jens Sucksdorff; Göran Dyhlén (2013). Sten Bergman – Kamtjatka, Kurilerna, Korea och Nya Guinea. Karlstad: Votum. Libris 14010325.  (inb.)

References

External links

Living people
Swedish writers
Swedish television personalities
1951 births